In Jewish law, a Posek (pl. poskim) is a legal scholar who determines the position of halakha, the Jewish religious laws derived from the written and Oral Torah in cases of Jewish law where previous authorities are inconclusive, or in those situations where no clear halakhic precedent exists.

The decision of a posek is known as a psak halakha ("ruling of law"; pl. piskei halakha) or simply a "psak". Piskei halakha are generally recorded in the responsa literature.

Orthodox Judaism 
Poskim play an integral role in Orthodox Judaism. 
 Generally, each community will regard one of its poskim as its Posek HaDor ("Posek of the present Generation").
 Most rely on the rav in their community (in Hasidic communities, sometimes the rebbe) or  the leading posek. 
Poskim will generally not overrule a specific law unless based on an earlier authority: a posek will generally extend a law to new situations but will not change the Halakhah; see the article on Orthodox Judaism.

Conservative Judaism 
Conservative Judaism approaches the idea of posek, and Halakha in general, somewhat differently: poskim here apply a relatively lower weighting to precedent, and will thus frequently re-interpret (or even change) a previous ruling through a formal argument; see Conservative Halakha. Although there are some "poskim" in the Conservative movement - e.g. Rabbis Louis Ginzberg, David Golinkin, Joel Roth, and Elliot Dorff - the rulings of any one individual rabbi are considered less authoritative than a consensus ruling. Thus, the Conservative movement's Rabbinical Assembly maintains a Committee on Jewish Law and Standards, whose decisions are accepted as authoritative within the American Conservative movement. At the same time, every Conservative rabbi has the right as mara d'atra to interpret Jewish law for his own community, regardless of the responsa of the Law Committee.

Progressive Judaism 
Both Reform and Reconstructionist Judaism do not regard Halakha as binding.

Although Reform stresses the individual autonomy of its membership, it never completely abandoned the field of responsa literature, if only to counter its rivals' demands. Even Classical Reformers such as Rabbi David Einhorn composed some. Rabbi Solomon Freehof, and his successor Rabbi Walter Jacob, attempted to create a concept of "Progressive Halacha", authoring numerous responsa based on a methodology laying great emphasis on current sensibilities and ethical ideals. Full text collections of Reform responsa are available on the website of the Central Conference of American Rabbis. 

The Reconstructionist position is that if Jews had formed cohesive communities again, their rulings would be binding, but presently Judaism is in a "post-Halakhic state". Therefore, their basic policy is to allow tradition "a vote, not a veto" in communal and personal affairs.

List of poskim and major works 
In chronological order, by the year of birth, and if needed, secondarily, by year of death and surname.

Poskim of past years

Pre-20th century 
 Yoel Sirkis (1561–1640), Bach
 David HaLevi Segal (1586–1667), Turei Zahav
 Sabbatai ha-Kohen (1621–1662), Shach
 Avraham Gombiner (c.1633–c.1683), Magen Avraham
 Yechezkel Landau (1713–1793), Noda Bihudah
 Vilna Gaon (1720–1797), Gra
 Shneur Zalman of Liadi (1745–1812), Shulchan Aruch HaRav
 Avraham Danzig (1748–1820), Chayei Adam
 Moses Sofer (1762–1839), Chasam Sofer
 Menachem Mendel Schneersohn (1789–1866), Tzemach Tzedek
 Shlomo Ganzfried (1804–1886), Kitzur Shulchan Aruch
 Yitzchak Elchanan Spektor (1817–1896)

Orthodox 
 Yechiel Michel Epstein (1829–1907), Aruch HaShulchan
 Yoseph Chaim of Bagdad (1832–1909), Ben Ish Chai, Rav Pealim
 Yisrael Meir Kagan (1838–1933), Mishnah Berurah, Chafetz Chaim
 Moshe Greenwald (1853–1910), Arugath HaBosem
 Chaim Ozer Grodzinski (1863–1940), Achiezer
 Abraham Isaac Kook (1865–1935)
 Eliezer David Greenwald (1867–1928), Keren L'Dovid
 Yaakov Chaim Sofer (1870–1939), Kaf HaChaim
 Avraham Duber Kahana Shapiro (1870–1943)
 Yonasan Steif, (1877–1958)
 Avraham Yeshayahu Karelitz (1878–1953), Chazon Ish
 Yechiel Yaakov Weinberg (1878–1966), Seridei Eish
 Yosef Eliyahu Henkin (1881–1973)
 Eliezer Silver (1882–1968)
 Yehezkel Abramsky (1886–1976)
 Yoel Teitelbaum (1887–1979), Vayoel Moshe, Divrei Yoel
 Avraham Chaim Naeh (1890–1954) Ketzos HaShulchan, Shiurei Mikveh, Shiurei Torah
 Zvi Yehuda Kook (1891–1982)
 Yaakov Kamenetsky (1891–1986)
 Aharon Kotler (1892–1962)
 Moshe Feinstein (1895–1986), Igrot Moshe
 Yitzchok Yaakov Weiss (1902–1989), Minchas Yitzchak
 Yosef Greenwald (1903–1984), Vayaan Yosef
 Joseph B. Soloveitchik (1903–1993)
 Yitzchok Hutner (1906–1980)
 Chanoch Dov Padwa (1908–2000), Cheishev Ho'Ephod
 Shlomo Zalman Auerbach (1910–1995), Minchat Shlomo
 Yosef Shalom Eliashiv (1910–2012)
 Chaim Pinchas Scheinberg (1910–2012)
 Pinhas Hirschprung (1912–1998)
 Shmuel Wosner (1913–2015), Shevet HaLevi
 Aharon Leib Shteinman (c. 1913–2017)
 Ephraim Oshry (1914–2003)
 Avraham Shapira (c. 1914–2007)
 Eliezer Waldenberg (1917–2006), Tzitz Eliezer
 Shlomo Goren (1918–1994)
 Chaim Kreiswirth (1918–2001)
 Yaakov Yitzhak Neumann (1920–2007), Ogiro Be'Oholcho
 Ovadia Yosef (1920–2013), Yabbia Omer
 Baruch Ben Haim (1921–2005)
 Fishel Hershkowitz (1922–2017), Klausenburger dayan in Williamsburg, Brooklyn, New York
 Hayim David HaLevi (1924–1998), Chief Rabbi of Tel Aviv, author of the set of halakha Mekor Hayim
 Menashe Klein (1924–2011), Ungvarer Rav; Mishneh Halachos
 Gedalia Dov Schwartz(1925–2020), av beit din of Beth Din of America and the Chicago Rabbinical Council
 Nissim Karelitz (1926–2019)
 Nahum Rabinovitch, (1928–2020) rosh yeshiva of Yeshivat Birkat Moshe
 Chaim Kanievsky (1928–2022)
 Mordechai Eliyahu (1929–2010)
 Dovid Feinstein (1929–2020)
Ephraim Greenblatt (1932–2014), Rivivos Efraim
Zalman Nechemia Goldberg (1932–2020), av beit din, rosh yeshiva of Machon Lev, editor-in-chief of the Encyclopedia Talmudit
 Aharon Lichtenstein (1933–2015), rosh yeshiva of Yeshivat Har Etzion
 Meir Brandsdorfer (1934–2009), Kaneh Bosem
 Yechezkel Roth (1936–2021) Karlsburger Rav, author of Emek HaTeshuvah
 Shimon Eider (1938–2007)
 Yisroel Belsky (1938–2016)
 Yehuda Henkin (1945–2020)
 Haim Drukman (1932–2022)

Conservative and Reform 
 Jacob Zallel Lauterbach (1873–1942)
 Louis Ginzberg (1873–1953), The Responsa of Professor Louis Ginzberg
 Solomon Freehof (1892–1990), Reform Jewish Practice and its Rabbinic Background
 Isaac Klein (1905–1979), A Guide to Jewish Religious Practice
 Jacob Agus (1911–1986), Dialogue and Tradition

Living poskim 
 Shmuel Kamenetsky (1924- ), rosh yeshiva, Talmudical Yeshiva of Philadelphia
 Yitzchak Abadi (1933- )
 Dov Lior (1933- )
 Avigdor Nebenzahl (1935- )
 Yaakov Ariel (1937- )
 Zephaniah Drori (1937- )
 Zalman Baruch Melamed (1937- )
 Yisrael Ariel (1939- )
 Eliyahu Ben Haim (1940- )
 Ephraim Padwa (1940-) rabbi of Union of Orthodox Hebrew Congregations
 Hershel Schachter (1941- ), rosh yeshiva at RIETS
 Shlomo Aviner (1943- )
 Mordechai Willig (1947- ), rosh yeshiva at RIETS
 Yitzhak Yosef (1952- ), Chief Sephardic Rabbi of the State of Israel, author of the set Yalkut Yosef
 Yitzchak Berkovits (1953- ), rosh kollel The Jerusalem Kollel
 Osher Weiss (1953- ), Minchas Osher
 Eliezer Melamed (1961- )
 Simcha Bunim Cohen, prolific author and pulpit rabbi in Lakewood, New Jersey
 Yisroel Dovid Harfenes author of Yisroel Vehazmanim, Mekadesh Yisroel and Nishmas Shabos
 Pinchas Toledano, hakham of the Spanish and Portuguese Jews of the Netherlands
 Gavriel Zinner author of the Nitei Gavriel series on halakha

See also 
 Dayan (rabbinic judge)
 Gemara
 History of responsa in Judaism
 Oral Torah
 Rabbinic authority

References

Further reading

External links
 An introduction to the system of Jewish Law , aish.com
 AskMoses.com, Live answers
 , archived from the 2004 original at nishmat.net 
 Jewish Law Research Guide, University of Miami Law Library
 Jewish Law: Examining Halacha, Jewish Issues and Secular Law (online journal)

 
 
Jewish law
Jewish religious occupations
Orthodox rabbinic roles and titles
Rabbis
Region-specific legal occupations